Edith Mbunga (born 31 October 1991) is an Angolan handball player.  

She participated at the 2012 Summer Olympics, where Angola placed 10th.

Mbunga was selected as the 15th player of the Angola women's national handball team.

References

1991 births
Living people
Angolan female handball players